Hartzviller is a commune in the Moselle department in Grand Est in north-eastern France.

Geography 
It is located about ten kilometres south of Sarrebourg. It has less than 1,000 inhabitants since the beginning of the 21st century but forms a small agglomeration with the communes of Troisfontaines and Walscheid, frequently referred to as the "Bièvre Valley", with 4,000 inhabitants. 

This commune is located in the historic region of Lorraine.

The Bièvre river crosses the village.

The Hartzviller train station is nowadays closed.

See also 
 Communes of the Moselle department

References

External links
 

Communes of Moselle (department)